Boulsbury Wood is a  biological Site of Special Scientific Interest  in Dorset and Hampshire. The site is west of Fordingbridge.

This site consists of parts of  Boulsbury   Wood,   High   Wood,   Stone   Hill Wood,  Martin  Wood  and  Blagdon  Hill  Wood. It has diverse habitats and flora, and Boulsbury Wood is the most species-rich wood in the county. Some parts are ancient woodland, with records dating from the thirteenth century.

References

Sites of Special Scientific Interest in Dorset
Sites of Special Scientific Interest in Hampshire
Sites of Special Scientific Interest notified in 1983
Woodland Sites of Special Scientific Interest